Jim Regnier (born July 22, 1944) was a justice of the Montana Supreme Court from 1997 to 2004.

Born in Aurora, Illinois, Regnier received a B.S. from Marquette University in 1966 and a J.D. from the University of Illinois College of Law in 1973. After working in private practice for five years, Regnier moved to Great Falls, Montana, where he worked in private practice. In 1991, he moved to Missoula, Montana, and in 1997 he was elected to the Montana Supreme Court.

References

Justices of the Montana Supreme Court
1944 births
Living people
Marquette University alumni
University of Illinois alumni
People from Aurora, Illinois